The Four Mile Run Trail is a 7-mile long, paved shared use path in Arlington County, Virginia.  It runs along Four Mile Run from  Benjamin Banneker Park in Falls Church to the Mount Vernon Trail near Ronald Reagan Washington National Airport, where Four Mile Run empties into the Potomac River. The trail runs roughly parallel to parts of the Washington & Old Dominion Railroad Trail as it follows Four Mile Run, sometimes on the other side of the stream.

History 
The trail opened on September 4, 1967 as a four-mile, unpaved trail between Roosevelt Street and the Columbia Pike. In 1966, Arlington County was one of 12 urban areas to receive a grant from the Department of the Interior as a demonstration of urban trails, the first such grants ever given. The Four Mile Run Trail was the first of these trails built, making it the nation's first shared use path built with federal funds. Secretary of the Interior Stewart Udall had created the program in hopes that it would build support for trails legislation he was supporting. That legislation later became the National Trail System Act of 1968. The trail was built adjacent to an existing hiking trail and the still extant W&OD railroad tracks. 

In the following years, the trail was paved and expanded. By 1971, most sections of the trail were paved, but it still had many low-water crossings and cinder-surfaced sections. By 1977, the trail had been expanded south to I-95, where it crossed I-95 on the Shirlington Overpass which had been opened in 1972, and west of Broad Street in Falls Church (along the Washington & Old Dominion (W&OD) right-of-way). In 1980, as part of construction of seven bridges across Four Mile Run - for Route 1, Potomac Yard railroad, the main rail line and the George Washington Parkway - the Army Corps of Engineers built an extension of the Four Mile Run Trail beneath them that connected the trail to the Mount Vernon Trail. Later that spring, the gap between the new section and I-95 was opened, connecting it to the W&OD Trail via the Shirlington Overpass. The work between the W&OD trail and the Mt. Vernon trail was to include an underpass beneath I-95, but that wouldn't be completed for nearly 30 years.
 
In 2009, a trail extension was completed near Shirlington that not only linked the end of the Washington & Old Dominion Railroad Trail with the Four Mile Run Trail, but also allowed trail users to pass under the Shirley Highway (Interstate 395) and West Glebe Road without having to ride on-street in Shirlington and Alexandria. A trail crossing had been promised at this location during construction of I-395 in the early 1970s.

Notes and references

External links
 

Parks in Arlington County, Virginia
Transportation in Arlington County, Virginia
Bike paths in Virginia